Daniel Joseph Lehmann (born September 5, 1985) is an American professional baseball coach and former minor league baseball catcher. He is the bench coach for the Los Angeles Dodgers of Major League Baseball (MLB).

Career
Lehmann was drafted by the Minnesota Twins in the 8th round of the 2007 MLB Draft out of Rice University and played in their farm system until 2013. He spent the final year of his playing career with the Sugar Land Skeeters of the independent Atlantic League.

After his playing career ended, he joined the Los Angeles Dodgers in 2015 as their Advance Video Scout and stayed in that role for three years. In 2018, the Dodgers promoted him to Game Planning and Communications coach. He served as a Dodgers' special assistant in 2019. Lehmann resumed his Game Planning and Communications coaching position in 2020. In 2023, he was promoted to bench coach.

References

External links

  

1985 births
Living people
Rice Owls baseball players
Minor league baseball players
Baseball catchers
Elizabethton Twins players
Beloit Snappers players
Fort Myers Miracle players
New Britain Rock Cats players
Rochester Red Wings players
Sugar Land Skeeters players
Los Angeles Dodgers coaches
Major League Baseball bench coaches